Lucy Noble Inman is a judge of the North Carolina Court of Appeals and formerly served as a special North Carolina Superior Court judge. She won election to the appellate court in a statewide race on November 4, 2014.

Early life
Inman is the daughter of author Lucy Daniels, the granddaughter of former White House Press Secretary Jonathan W. Daniels, and the great-granddaughter of Navy Secretary Josephus Daniels. She was born in Indianapolis, Indiana while her father was working at the Indianapolis Star. The family returned to Raleigh while she was an infant.

Education
Inman earned her undergraduate degree from North Carolina State University in 1984 and worked as a newspaper reporter before attending law school at the University of North Carolina School of Law. After earning her J.D. degree in 1990, she clerked for Chief Justice James G. Exum at the North Carolina Supreme Court.

Career
Inman was in private practice from 1992 to 2010.
She and her husband, Billy Warden, lived in Los Angeles, California from 1992 to 2000, where she practiced civil litigation, concentrating on disputes in commercial, media, and entertainment law. She was recognized for her pro bono work by the California State Bar. Upon returning to North Carolina in 2000, she shifted her practice and spent the next decade representing victims of negligence, fraud and sexual abuse.

In 2010, she was appointed to the superior court as a special judge by Governor Bev Perdue. After being appointed to the North Carolina Superior Court, she presided in hearings and jury trials in courthouses across the state. She won election to the Court of Appeals in 2014, defeating District Court Judge Bill Southern in a race to replace retiring Judge Robert C. Hunter. In the 2014 judicial election, she received endorsements from retired North Carolina Chief Justices Henry Frye, James Exum, I. Beverly Lake Jr., and Burley Mitchell.

Before becoming a judge, Inman advocated for mental health services for children and adults in North Carolina.  She served on the North Carolina Governor's Advocacy Council for Persons with Disabilities and as a board member of Carolina Legal Assistance and Disability Rights North Carolina.

In January 2019, Inman announced that she was a candidate at the 2020 North Carolina judicial elections for an eight-year term as a justice of the North Carolina Supreme Court. In November, she was narrowly defeated by Republican Phil Berger Jr.

In 2022, she again ran for a seat on the North Carolina Supreme Court, but was defeated by Richard Dietz. 

Inman has also served on the boards of the Lucy Daniels Foundation and North Carolinians Against Gun Violence and has chaired the judicial division of the North Carolina Association of Women Attorneys. She currently serves on the board of NC BarCARES, a non-profit entity funded by the North Carolina Bar Association that provides confidential mental health and substance abuse treatment for attorneys and judges. She is a member of the National Association of Women Judges and has served on the education committee of the Appellate Judges Education Institute.

Personal life
Inman's son, William Warden, has struggled with bipolar disorder and schizophrenia all his life. In January 2020, he pled guilty in Wake County District Court to a misdemeanor charge of ethnic intimidation for threatening a local synagogue in 2018. His attorney read an apology letter from him. The court accepted his guilty plea and ordered him to comply with terms of unsupervised probation for one year, on conditions including that he remain in psychiatric treatment.

References

1962 births
21st-century American women
American women judges
Living people
North Carolina Court of Appeals judges
North Carolina Democrats
North Carolina State University alumni
People from Indianapolis
University of North Carolina School of Law alumni